Ooni Lumobi was the 22nd Ooni of Ife, a paramount traditional ruler of Ile Ife, the ancestral home of the Yorubas. He succeeded Ooni Luwoo and was succeeded by  
Ooni Agbedegbede.

References

Oonis of Ife
Yoruba history